Jatrai Jatra is a 2019 Nepalese comedy thriller film, directed by Pradip Bhattarai and written by Rhythm Paudel . Rhythm Paudel has played a huge role developing this film.  The film is produced by Pawan Shrestha, Rhythm Paudel and Rabindra Singh Baniya under the banner of Shatkon Arts. The film stars Bipin Karki, Dayahang Rai, Rabindra Singh Baniya, Rabindra Jha and Barsha Raut in the lead roles. The film is the sequel and follow up of 2016 Heist comedy Jatra released on 2016.
The film deals aftermath life of Fanindra, Munna and Joyes after they get released from jail on bail and also the consequences after they find bag of gold.

Plot 
The first film ended with Fanindra Timilsina (Bipin Karki), Joyes (Rabindra Singh Baniya), and Munna (Rabindra Jha) being arrested for possessing a bag full of counterfeit money. In the sequel, they’ve been found innocent and released from custody after two years. But finding a job is difficult out in the real world. Munna is kicked out of his barber shop; Joyes cannot find the love of his life and somehow ends up in a job delivering oxygen tanks; and Fanindra needs to find a better life for his wife Sampada (Barsha Raut) and son Iman (Arbein Khadka). Fanindra tries different jobs, finally ending up as a taxi driver to a Brahmin sahu (Rajaram Paudel).

One day, Fanindra’s taxi is ransacked by goons while driving a rowdy customer, Dawa (Daya Hang Rai). The gangsters kidnap Dawa but a crateful of chicken that Dawa was carrying is left behind. These chicken turn out to be hiding gold biscuits.

Fanindra decides he wants to keep the gold, but the goons are obviously looking for it. So Fanindra and his friends must now protect the gold and themselves.

Who takes the gold? Are they able to make everything in their life same once again and solve all their economical problems? This all question's answers form the rest of the story. With the links from the previous movie, it catches the attention of the viewers and keep them glued to the screen till the very end.

Cast 

 Bipin Karki as Phadindra dra Timsina/Pharen
 Dayahang Rai as Dawa 
 Rabindra Singh Baniya as Joyesh
 Rabindra Jha as Munna
 Barsha Raut as Sampada/Sampu, Phdindra's Wife
 Prem Pandey as Jawai of Sampada 
 Rajaram Paudel as Pandit
 Master Arbien Khadka as Iman , son of Phadindra and Sampada
 Priyanka Jha as the wife of Munna

Reception 
The film received mixed responses from critics with praise for its performances, twist and turns and proper sequel storyline of the film but unnecessary events shown in the film and predictability was criticized. The film has earned around रु 11 crores , emerging as a success at the box office.

The Annapurna Express rated it 2.5 out of 5 stars, and stated: "Jatrai Jatrai feels like the makers hurried a bit too much to recreate the success of the original Jatra and in doing so, left too many loose ends."

References 

Nepalese sequel films